Sandy Ferguson (1867–1894) was a Scottish footballer who played in the Football League for Notts County.

References

1867 births
1894 deaths
Scottish footballers
Notts County F.C. players
English Football League players
Footballers from Glasgow
Rangers F.C. players
Association football midfielders
FA Cup Final players